"Can I Go Now" is the second and final single from American actress Jennifer Love Hewitt's fourth studio album, BareNaked. The song was written by Mike Stevens, Livingstone Brown, and Meredith Brooks, who also produced the track, and was released as a single on January 13, 2003. The single failed to chart in the United States but peaked at number 12 in Australia and number eight in the Netherlands.

Promotion
In order to promote the single, Hewitt appeared on TV shows and events including ProBowl, The Orlando Jones Show and performing an acoustic version of the song on Sessions@AOL.

Track listing
Maxi-CD
 "Can I Go Now" (radio mix) – 3:34
 "Just Try" (album version) – 3:43
 "I Know You Will" (album version) – 3:17
 "Can I Go Now" (video)

Charts

Weekly charts

Year-end charts

Certifications

Release history

References

2002 songs
2003 singles
Jennifer Love Hewitt songs
Jive Records singles
Songs written by Meredith Brooks